In Technicolor is the fourth studio album by American recording artist Jesse McCartney.  This album marks his return to music after the shelved effort of Have It All. Before the release of this album, McCartney released an extended play, In Technicolor (Part 1), which contained several songs from the album, as a teaser of what fans could expect from his upcoming album.

Background

In 2010, McCartney announced he was planning to release his fourth studio album titled Have It All. The first single from the album, "Shake" was released on September 21, 2010. Have It All was then slated for a January 2011 release. McCartney had prepared over 50 songs for the album, ultimately choosing 11 to make the final cut with producers like Sean Garrett, Kevin Rudolf, Ammo, J Cash,  and rapper Tyga. The sound of Have It All was aimed at being more mature than his previous 2008 album Departure. However, Have It All was never released. In April 2011, McCartney stated on his Twitter account that the album wouldn't be released until they heard about the outcome of Locke & Key, a television series that he had a lead role in. The following year, McCartney revealed in an interview that Have It All was delayed because of some acting jobs he couldn't turn down as well as many other reasons. McCartney's mother announced that the president of Hollywood Records had retired which delayed the release of the album. In the March 2013 issue of Glamholic magazine, McCartney stated that he was currently writing and producing his fourth studio album and that there would be "lots of new material." On August 13, 2013 a single was released, "Back Together" through McCartney's own new record label, Eight0Eight Records. He chose to leave Hollywood Records because "it made more sense" in this point of his career to release his music on his own. A four-song EP was released on December 10, 2013 titled In Technicolor (Part I). McCartney chose to release an EP before the album to give his fans his new music and to allow time to still finish up his full-length album. In June 2014, Jesse McCartney officially announced the title of his fourth studio album as In Technicolor and set the release date of July 22.

Release and promotion
In Technicolor became available for pre-order through iTunes and Amazon on June 11, 2014. Four days before the album's release, a ballad titled "The Other Guy" was released to MTV exclusively to promote the album. On July 21, 2014 McCartney performed his single "Superbad" on The Today Show. McCartney will embark on a headlining North American concert tour called the In Technicolor Tour. The tour will begin on July 25, 2014 in Charlotte, N.C. and will end on September 4 in Anaheim, CA. In Technicolor was released on July 22, 2014 through Eight0Eight Records. Upon release, In Technicolor reached the top 20 albums on iTunes Top Albums chart.

Critical reception
Upon release, In Technicolor received mostly positive reviews. USA Today gave the album three out of four stars stating that "McCartney flaunts his love of pop-soul without apology" which results in "an easy, breezy collection that some more presumptuous former tween idols would do well to study" and labeled "Tie the Knot" and "All About Us" as the standout tracks. Jason Scott from Pop Dust rated the album 4/5. He wrote that McCartney's "smooth and jazz-fused vocals" helped move him "from a simple heartthrob to legitimate musician" and compared the style of the album to those of Bruno Mars and Justin Timberlake.

Commercial performance
In Technicolor debuted at No. 35 on the Billboard 200 and No. 7 on the Independent Albums chart, selling 7,846 copies in its first week.

Track listing

Personnel
Katisse Buckingham – alto saxophone, tenor saxophone
James Casey – tenor saxophone
The Elev3n – drum programming
Juliet Haffner – viola
Robbie Kondor – piano, string arrangements
Jesse McCartney – lead vocals, background vocals
James G. Morales – drums, percussion
Matt Morales – horn arrangements, trumpet
Troy "R8DIO" Johnson – drum programming, keyboards, synthesizer
Amy Ralske – cello
Julio David Rodriguez – [[bass guitar, acoustic guitar, electric guitar

Charts

References

Jesse McCartney albums
2014 albums
Self-released albums